Nova Nekrasivka is a village in Izmail Raion, Odesa Oblast, Ukraine. It belongs to Safiany rural hromada, one of the hromadas of Ukraine.

Notable people
 Vitalie Zubac

Demographics
1930: 2,378 (census)
1940: 2,552 (estimate)
2001: 2,051 (census)

References

External links 
 Datele generale ale recensământului din 2001
 Новая Некрасовка în Istoria orașelor și satelor din RSS Ucraineană, Vol. "Regiunea Odesa" (Kiev, 1969), p. 459

Villages in Izmail Raion